Stéphane Freiss (born 22 November 1960) is a French film, television, and stage actor. He won a César Award for his performance in the 1988 film Chouans!.

Selected filmography

Premiers désirs (1984)
Vagabond (1985)
Chouans! (1988)
1001 Nights (1990)
The King's Whore (1990)
Does This Mean We're Married? (1991)
Kings for a Day (1997)
The Misadventures of Margaret (1998)
Alias Betty (2001)
Monsieur N. (2003)
Crime Spree (2003)
5x2 (2004)
Munich (2005)
Call Me Elisabeth (2006)
Welcome to the Sticks (2008)
Hereafter (2010)
Another Life (2013)
My Old Lady (2014)
The Confessions (2016)

References

External links

1960 births
Living people
Male actors from Paris
French male film actors
Most Promising Actor César Award winners
20th-century French male actors
21st-century French male actors
French male stage actors
French male television actors